Shapur of Ray was a Sasanian military officer from the Mihran family. The city Ray in his name was the seat of the Mihran family.

According to Abu Hanifa Dinawari (d. 896), Shapur was the governor of the two Mesopotamian districts of Khutarniyah and Babylonia during Kavad I's reign. According to al-Tabari, he held the rank of "Supreme Commander of the Land" (iṣbahbadh al-bilād). Ferdowsi records him being recalled by Kavad I to destroy the powerful Sukhra of Karen family, who was also Shapur Razi's rival. Shapur Razi defeated and captured Sukhra in Shiraz. The Mihran-Karen rivalry became proverbial in the contemporary Sasanian society, as reflected in the expression "Sukhra's wind has died away, and a wind belonging to Mihran has now started to blow".

He briefly served as the governor (marzban) of Persian Armenia from 483 to 484.

References

Sources

 

5th-century deaths
5th-century Iranian people
Sasanian governors of Armenia
5th-century births
House of Mihran
Generals of Peroz I
People from Ray, Iran
Generals of Kavad I
Spahbeds
Generals of Balash